Ronny Nikol (born 11 July 1974) is a German former professional footballer who played as a left wing-back. 

Nikol originally wanted to by an athlete at SG Dynamo Adlershof. He only started playing football at the age of 16 at enterprise sports community BSG Elektro-Apparate-Werke Treptow. From there he moved to the youth department of BFC Dynamo.  

Nikol made his first appearance with the first team of BFC Dynamo, then named FC Berlin, against SV Motor 09 Eberswalde in the 34th matchday of the 1991-92 NOFV-Oberliga on 17 May 1992. He then became regular player for FC Berlin the 1992-93 NOFV-Oberliga. Nikol left FC Berlin 1. FC Nürnberg after the 1994-95 season.

Honours
Regionalliga Süd (III): 1997
Regionalliga Nord (III): 2001, 2006

DFB-Pokal: Runner-up: 2000–01

References

1974 births
Living people
People from East Berlin
German footballers
Association football fullbacks
Footballers from Berlin
Berliner FC Dynamo players
1. FC Nürnberg players
1. FC Union Berlin players
FC Energie Cottbus players
Rot-Weiss Essen players
Dynamo Dresden players
Berliner AK 07 players
VSG Altglienicke players
2. Bundesliga players
3. Liga players
East German footballers